Sweet Wivelsfield is an album by Martin Carthy, released in 1974. It was re-issued by Topic Records on LP in 1981 and on CD in 1996.

It is the first of a trilogy of Martin Carthy albums which were produced by Fairport Convention founder and former Steeleye Span bandmate Ashley Hutchings. Both had played on an electric version of the song "Skewbald" on Steeleye Span's 1971 album Ten Man Mop, or Mr. Reservoir Butler Rides Again.

Track listing
All songs are Traditional and were arranged by Martin Carthy
 "Shepherd O Shepherd" – 3:23
 "Billy Boy" – 2:52
 "Three Jolly Sneaksmen" – 4:15
 "Trimdon Grange" – 6:25
 "All of a Row" – 2:38
 "Skewbald" – 3:39
 "Mary Neal" – 3:59
 "King Henry" – 6:21
 "John Barleycorn" – 2:21
 "The Cottage in the Wood" – 6:13

Personnel
Martin Carthy – vocals, acoustic guitar (1-6,8,10)
Technical
Ashley Hutchings – production
Jerry Boys - engineer
Keith Morris - photography
Keith Davis - cover illustration

References

External links
https://mainlynorfolk.info/martin.carthy/records/sweetwivelsfield.html

1974 albums
Martin Carthy albums
Topic Records albums